Donca Steriade (born 1951 in Bucharest) is a professor of Linguistics at MIT, specializing in phonological theory.

Education 
She began her academic career studying classics in Bucharest, after earning her B.A. (licență) in Philology from the University of Bucharest in 1974.  She left Romania after her father emigrated to Canada. (She is the daughter of neuroscientist Mircea Steriade.) She earned  her M.A. from Université Laval in 1976, She studied for her PhD at the MIT Department of Linguistics and Philosophy under Morris Halle. Her 1982 dissertation is titled, "Greek prosodies and the nature of syllabification".

After earning her PhD, she took up a position at UCLA before returning to MIT to become Professor of Linguistics.

Honors 
Steriade was named Professor Honoris Causa by the Faculty of Letters at the University of Bucharest in 2017.

She was inducted as a LSA (Linguistics Society of America) Fellow in 2015. She was invited to give the Edward Sapir lecture at the 2009 LSA Linguistic Institute and she was an instructor at the 2007 LSA Linguistic Institute.

Research 
Steriade's research focuses on phonology and morphophonology, and she is considered a leading contributor to theories of underspecification (Steriade 1995) and neutralization (Steriade 2007). She has also researched the basic units of rhythm in language. She has worked on a range of Indo-European languages and has published and co-published broadly, including journal articles and book chapters, as well as the widely cited edited volume, Phonetically Based Phonology and Linguistics: An Introduction to Linguistic Theory.

Key publications 
 Hayes, Bruce, Robert Kirchner and Donca Steriade. 2004. Phonetically Based Phonology. Cambridge University Press. 
Hayes, Bruce et al. 1999. Linguistics: an Introduction to Linguistics Theory. Wiley-Blackwell. 
Steriade, Donca (2007) Contrast. In The Cambridge Handbook of Phonology, ed. P. de Lacy. 139–158. Cambridge University Press 
Steriade, Donca (2002) The Syllable. In The Oxford Encyclopedia of Linguistics, ed. W. Frawley
Steriade, Donca (2001) Directional asymmetries in place assimilation: A perceptual account. In The Role of Speech Perception in Phonology, eds. E. Hume and K. Johnson, 219–250. New York: Academic Press.
 Steriade, Donca (2000) Paradigm uniformity and the phonetics-phonology boundary. In Papers in Laboratory Phonology V: Acquisition and the Lexicon, eds. M. B. Broe and J. B. Pierrehumbert, 313–334. Cambridge: Cambridge University Press.
 Steriade, Donca (1995) Underspecification and markedness. In J. Goldsmith (ed.) The Handbook of Phonological Theory. Oxford: Blackwell. 114–174.
 Steriade, Donca (1988) Reduplication and syllable transfer in Sanskrit and elsewhere. Phonology 5.73-155.
 Steriade, Donca (1987) Locality conditions and feature geometry. Proceedings of NELS 17. 595–618.

References

External links 
 http://linguistics.mit.edu/user/steriade/
 http://www.linguistics.ucla.edu/people/steriade/steriade.htm
 https://mit.academia.edu/DoncaSteriade

1951 births
Living people
Linguists
MIT School of Humanities, Arts, and Social Sciences faculty
University of California, Los Angeles faculty
Université Laval alumni
University of Bucharest alumni
Romanian emigrants to Canada
Fellows of the Linguistic Society of America
Women linguists
Phonologists
MIT School of Humanities, Arts, and Social Sciences alumni